The wellbeing services counties (Finnish: hyvinvointialue, Swedish: välfärdsområde, Northern Sami: buresveadjinguovlu, Inari Sami: pyereestvaijeemkuávlu, Skolt Sami: pueʹrrvââjjamvuʹvdd) are public bodies separate from the municipalities of Finland and the Finnish Government following the social reform instigated by the Marin Cabinet, each of which has self-government within its territory. On 23 June 2021, Parliament approved bills on social and health care reform. According to the law on the implementation of the reform, the tasks and organizational responsibility of social and health care and rescue services will be transferred from the municipalities to the counties on 1 January 2023. The first elections to the councils were held in January 2022.

In order to implement regional co-operation and an appropriate service structure, five co-operation areas will be formed from the counties, which correspond to the current special areas of responsibility of university hospitals.

Each county organizes the tasks prescribed for it by law, which at the beginning of the activity are the organization of social and health care and rescue services. A county may also perform functions in its territory that support its statutory functions, such as international activities and the protection of the mutual interests of the counties. It may engage in a low-risk business in its territory or in conjunction with another county that supports the performance of its statutory functions. Under an agreement, the counties can carry out their tasks together. The forms of co-operation are a joint institution, a joint post, an agreement on the performance of official duties and a wellbeing consortium. The business of a consortium can only be the provision of support services. Responsibility for organizing cannot be delegated to a consortium.

Administration of the wellbeing services counties 
The highest decision-making body in the wellbeing county is the county council, which is responsible for the operation, administration and finances of the welfare area. The delegates and deputy commissioners of the county council are elected in the county elections for a four-year term. The number of delegates is 59–89, depending on the population of the county.

 59 councillors: Central Ostrobothnia, Kainuu, East Uusimaa, South Karelia, South Savo, Kymenlaakso, North Karelia, Kanta-Häme, Ostrobothnia, Lapland, South Ostrobothnia
 69 councillors: Central Uusimaa, Päijät-Häme, Satakunta, North Savo, Central Finland and Vantaa-Kerava.
 79 councillors: North Ostrobothnia, West Uusimaa, Southwest Finland, Pirkanmaa

List of the Wellbeing services counties 

There will be 21 Wellbeing services counties in Finland:
 Lapland wellbeing services county
 North Ostrobothnia wellbeing services county
 Kainuu wellbeing services county 
 Central Ostrobothnia wellbeing services county 
 Central Finland wellbeing services county
 North Savo wellbeing services county
 North Karelia wellbeing services county
 South Savo wellbeing services county
 South Ostrobothnia wellbeing services county 
 Pirkanmaa wellbeing services county 
 Kanta-Häme wellbeing services county
 Ostrobothnia wellbeing services county
 Satakunta wellbeing services county
 Southwest Finland wellbeing services county 
 West Uusimaa wellbeing services county
 Central Uusimaa wellbeing services county
 East Uusimaa wellbeing services county
 Päijät-Häme wellbeing services county
 Kymenlaakso wellbeing services county
 South Karelia wellbeing services county 
 Vantaa-Kerava wellbeing services county

In addition, the City of Helsinki (22.) and the autonomous Region of Åland (23.) will remain outside the Wellbeing services counties, exercising similar competences by themselves.

See also 

Counties of Finland
2022 Finnish county elections

References 

Subdivisions of Finland
Regions of Finland